The X Factor is a British television music competition to find new singing talent. The eleventh series began airing on ITV on 30 August 2014 and finished on 14 December 2014. Dermot O'Leary presented his eighth series of the main show on ITV and Sarah-Jane Crawford presented spin-off show The Xtra Factor on ITV2, replacing Caroline Flack and Matt Richardson. Louis Walsh was the only judge from series 10 to return and was joined by former judges Cheryl Fernandez-Versini, Simon Cowell, and new judge Mel B, who replaced Sharon Osbourne, Gary Barlow and Nicole Scherzinger. Former judge Tulisa returned as a guest judge for the final on 13 December due to Mel B being ill. The series also saw the lower age limit decreased from 16 to 14, as it was in series 4 and 5. This was Walsh's final series as a judge before returning in series 13.  It was O'Leary's final series as presenter on the main show, as he announced on 27 March 2015 that he was leaving to pursue other projects, before returning in series 13. On 11 May, Crawford also confirmed via Twitter that she would leave her position as The Xtra Factor presenter.

Room auditions took place in Manchester, London, Newcastle and Edinburgh from 16 June to 1 July, followed by arena auditions in London, that were held between 1 and 4 August. Bootcamp was held in London in August and judges' houses around Nice, Los Angeles, Bermuda and Cancún in September. The live shows began on 11 October. Fernandez-Versini mentored the Girls, Mel B mentored the Boys, Walsh mentored the Groups and Cowell mentored the Over 26s. Ben Haenow won the series against Fleur East on 14 December 2014 with 57.2% of the votes.

Judges, presenters and other personnel

During the tenth series, Sharon Osbourne stated that she was only back for one series, to "go out on a high". Also, during the first live show of series 10, Gary Barlow revealed that it would be his last series on the show. Louis Walsh, who had also been on the show from its first series, announced his intention to quit as well, although he later backtracked and said that he "might come back" if Simon Cowell returned. Midway throughout the live shows, Walsh said "I'm having so much fun this year, I might stay".

On 7 February 2014, Cowell, who left the UK show after series 7 to launch and judge the USA show, announced his return for Gary Barlow's replacement. He said, "I'm absolutely thrilled to be returning to The X Factor UK. It's been three years since I last judged the competition and I'm excited to find a global superstar again. On 13 February, it was reported that Nicole Scherzinger had departed the show, On 14 February, Cowell announced that Scherzinger would not be returning by tweeting, "Nicole will always be a part of the X factor family. Now signed to Sony as an artist. Thank you Nicole for everything. On 24 February, former judge, Dannii Minogue confirmed that she would remain on The X Factor Australia judging panel for the 2014 Australia series, rather than return as a judge for the UK show to replace Scherzinger, after Minogue joined the Australian show the year before, despite popular demand in the UK for her to return for the 2014 UK series. On 10 March, former judge Cheryl Cole announced on her Instagram that she will be returning for the eleventh series to replace Osbourne, posting an image of herself and Cowell, accompanied by the caption: "GUESS WHAT!!.. I'm baaaacccckkkkk!!!!" On 30 May, Walsh confirmed he would be returning as a judge for his eleventh series. On 11 June, it was confirmed that series 9 guest judge Mel B, who has also previously judged the Australian version, would join the panel as the fourth permanent judge for Scherzinger's replacement. Following Cole's wedding to Jean-Bernard Fernandez-Versini on 7 July, it was announced by producers that she would be known throughout the series as her new married name, Cheryl Fernandez-Versini. On 13 December 2014, it was announced that former judge Tulisa would return as a guest judge for the final due to Mel B being ill.

Dermot O'Leary confirmed his return for his eighth series as presenter of the main show on ITV. On 3 February 2014, it was reported that Matt Richardson would not return as co-presenter on The Xtra Factor on ITV2. This was later denied, but it was confirmed on 4 June that Richardson would not return. On 11 June, Caroline Flack confirmed on Twitter that she will not be returning as presenter of The Xtra Factor. The next day, it was confirmed that Sarah-Jane Crawford will be the new presenter. Following her departure, Flack began competing as a contestant in the twelfth series of Strictly Come Dancing on BBC One. Brian Friedman, who served as creative director from series 4-7 before returning to work on the first three live shows of series 9, returned to replace Jerry Reeve and Mark "Swany" Swanhart.

Series 11 was originally O'Leary's final series hosting The X Factor, as he announced in March 2015 his decision to exit the series to pursue other projects. He was later replaced by Caroline Flack and Olly Murs, the latter of whom was a contestant during the competition's sixth series. This was also originally the last series to feature Louis Walsh as a judge after 11 years, as he quit in May 2015 to return to full-time management. It was also the only series to feature new judge Spice Girls star Mel B. They were replaced by BBC Radio 1 presenter Nick Grimshaw and The Voice UK coach, Rita Ora. Osbourne, Walsh, Scherzinger (who collectively replaced Cheryl, Grimshaw and Ora) and O'Leary returned to the show alongside Cowell for the 13th and 14th series, with O'Leary remaining for series 15.

Promotion
On 12 March 2014, Cowell and Cole, the only confirmed judges at the time, appeared in a Daybreak interview together to promote the eleventh series for the first time. They discussed the upcoming series, their individual returns, Cole's departure from The X Factor USA and their subsequent feud; with Cowell admitting, "I made a mistake" (in relation to Cole's sudden departure). Two advertisements subsequently began to air on ITV featuring Cole and Cowell separately, to encourage potential contestants to audition. Previous contestants Olly Murs, Shayne Ward, One Direction, Jahméne Douglas and Little Mix also appeared in videos encouraging potential applicants to audition.

Rumored judges for the series included Ellie Goulding, Paloma Faith, Rita Ora, Kesha, and Murs.

On 12 June, during ITV's coverage of the opening match of the 2014 FIFA World Cup, a teaser trailer with the caption "Things Are About to Get Loud" first aired. The full trailer, featuring all four of the judges, was unveiled on ITV's YouTube channel on 1 August, and received its first TV airing the following evening.

Selection process

Eligibility
On 11 March 2014, Cowell confirmed at a press conference in London that closed room auditions would return for series 11, as well as the six-seat challenge at bootcamp. It was also revealed that the minimum age was being lowered from 16 to 14, as it was in series 4 and 5.

Auditions

Mobile auditions
In addition to the producers' auditions, the "Mobile Audition Tour" took place up and down the UK and Ireland throughout March and April. Auditions began to open on 24 March, and visited Cork, Belfast, Newquay, Exeter, Bournemouth, Southampton, Bristol, Newport, Barry, Swansea, Romford, Leicester, Brighton, Norwich, Sunderland, Middlesbrough, South Shields, Durham, Glasgow, Dundee, Aberdeen, Ayr, Solihull, Dudley, Coventry, Wolverhampton, Warrington, Leeds, Hull, Sheffield, Birkenhead, Blackpool, Bolton and Widnes by 28 April.

Open auditions

Producers auditions commenced on 5 April in Dublin and ended on 5 May in Liverpool. For the first time, nine open auditions were held, instead of the usual six, and the five in series 6 and 10. This series marked the first time that auditions had visited Ireland since series 7. It was also the first time open auditions were held in Plymouth and Edinburgh.

Judges auditions
Continuing from the format from the last series, both room auditions and arena auditions were held for the judges. In this series four locations were used for the judges auditions, the fewest used in a series at the time (series 12 used two). The auditions started in Manchester (Old Trafford Cricket Ground) on 16 and 17 June. The London auditions (Emirates Stadium) took place on 20 June and from 22–24 June, and were followed by Newcastle (St. James' Park) on 26 June, before concluding in Edinburgh (Assembly Rooms) on 1 July. The only judge missing from an audition day was Mel B, whose absence occurred during one of the arena audition days, due to commitments with America's Got Talent.

The first room audition episode aired on 30 August, and featured Manchester, London and Edinburgh. More room auditions from London, Edinburgh and Manchester, along with those from Newcastle, were shown in 31 August episode.

Notable returning auditionees included Fleur East who reached the live shows in series 2 in the girl group Addictiv Ladies; Chloe Jasmine, who was rejected by the judges at her audition in series 3; Amy Connelly, who reached judges' houses in series 5; Jake Quickenden, who reached judges' houses in series 9; Lydia Lucy, who reached bootcamp in series 10; Tom Mann, who reached bootcamp in series 10; Barclay Beales, who reached bootcamp in series 10; and Paul Akister, who reached judges houses in series 10. Mann and Beales were both eventually put into the eight-piece boy band Stereo Kicks.

Bootcamp/Six Chair Challenge
It was reported in March 2014 that Cowell was considering axing the bootcamp stage in favour of the "six-seat challenge" from series 10, whereby judges were assigned their categories at the start of bootcamp and contestants took it in turns to perform for their judge. The six-seat challenge involves successful contestants being offered one of "six seats", representing places at the judges' houses stage of the competition. However, if a judge had already chosen six acts for their category, they could replace them if they preferred a later act. This was a controversial input to the series as many were disappointed to see acts sent home in such a harsh way.

Despite the reports, both bootcamp and the six-seat challenge took place. Mel B's commitments to America's Got Talent delayed her re-entry to the UK until the end of the boot camp stage, after Cowell, Fernandez-Versini and Walsh had finished deliberating on the remaining contestants earlier that day. It was only then that all four judges learned their categories: Walsh was given the Groups category, Mel B was given the Boys, Fernandez-Versini was given the Girls and Cowell was given the Over 26s. The six-seat challenge took place at The SSE Arena, Wembley on 9 and 10 August. A total of 114 acts successfully reached the bootcamp this year. They were put into groups within their own categories and took part in a sing-off, where the judges cut half of the acts, leaving only 57 acts to compete for the "six-seat challenge". Any contestant under 16 could not be swapped out if they were given a seat.

Judges' houses
For judges' houses, Walsh took the Groups to Bermuda and was assisted by former judge Tulisa Contostavlos; Mel B took the Boys to Cancún, with assistance from fellow Spice Girls member Emma Bunton; Fernandez-Versini took the Girls to Nice and was assisted by Tinie Tempah; and Cowell took the Over 26s to Los Angeles, where he was assisted by Sinitta.

Girls:
 Kerrianne: "Hurt"
 Lauren: "Beneath Your Beautiful"
 Emily: "Story of My Life"
 Chloe: "Somewhere Over the Rainbow"
 Stephanie: "Careless Whisper"
 Lola: "All of Me"

Boys:
 Danny: "Beautiful Disaster"
 Jordan: "Apologize"
 Paul: "Bridge over Troubled Water"
 Andrea: "And I Am Telling You I'm Not Going"
 Jack: "Halo"
 Jake: "Every Little Thing She Does Is Magic"

Groups:
 Only The Young: "Ghost"
 Stereo Kicks: "Mirrors"
 Blonde Electra: "Gold Digger"
 Concept: "XO" 
 New Girl Group: "Say Something"
 The Brooks: "Jar of Hearts"

Over 26s
 Ben: "With a Little Help from My Friends"
 Fleur: "Bang Bang"
 Lizzy: "Don't Make Me"
 Helen: "I'd Rather Go Blind"
 Jay: "Everybody Hurts"
 Stevie: "I'm a Believer"
 

Overload Generation were originally eliminated during Boot Camp after being switched out in the six chair challenge. Despite this, Mel B chose them as Walsh's Wildcard act over the three groups that had been eliminated during the Judges Houses round.

Acts 

Key:
 – Winner
 – Runner-up
 – Wildcard (Live Shows)

Live shows
On September 24, 2014, a wildcard twist was announced for the live shows. However, in a change to previous years, the judges selected the wildcard acts for each other's categories. Fernandez-Versini chose Stevi Ritchie for the Over 26s; Mel B chose Overload Generation for the Groups; Cowell chose Jack Walton for the Boys; and Walsh chose Lola Saunders for the Girls. This meant that there would be 16 contestants , and there would be double eliminations like in series 7 and 8.

For the first time in the show's history, all votes via the official app will be free of charge. Mark Brittain, Global Head of Commercial at Syco Entertainment, announced, "We are constantly looking to innovate around the show. Giving the viewers the ability to vote free through the app will allow viewers, we believe, an even greater opportunity to interact with their favourite show and, of course, play the hugely important role in deciding the ultimate winner of the series."

The live shows began on 11 October 2014. Pharrell Williams and Taylor Swift performed on the first live results show, whilst Jessie J and Maroon 5 performed on the second live results show. The third live results show featured performances from OneRepublic and Ed Sheeran. The Script performed on the fourth live show, whilst John Legend and The X Factor judge Cheryl Fernandez-Versini performed on the following results show. The fifth live results show featured performances from Sam Smith and 2010 contestants One Direction, and the sixth live results show featured performances from former judge Nicole Scherzinger and 2009 runner-up Olly Murs. In addition, this results show had the world premiere of the official music video for Band Aid 30. The seventh live show included a performance from David Guetta featuring Emeli Sandé, while Labrinth and Take That performed on the following results show. Queen + Adam Lambert, series 9 contestants Union J and series 9 contestant Ella Henderson performed on the quarter-final results show on 30 November. The X Factor USA 2012 finalists, Fifth Harmony, The X Factor UK 2013 Sam Bailey, and Idina Menzel and Michael Bublé performed on the semi-final live results show on 7 December 2014. Take That, Meghan Trainor and Ed Sheeran performed on the live final on Saturday 13 December 2014, while Olly Murs featuring Demi Lovato, One Direction featuring Ronnie Wood and Sam Smith performed on the live final results show on Sunday 14 December 2014.

Results summary

Colour key
 Act in Boys

 Act in Girls

 Act in Over 25s

 Act in Groups

 The voting percentages in the Final for the Sunday Vote do not add up to 100%, owing to the freezing of votes. Andrea Faustini received 8.5% of the final vote.

Live show details

Week 1 (11/12 October)
Theme: Number ones
Group performance: "Anything Could Happen"
Musical guests: Pharrell Williams ("Gust of Wind") and Taylor Swift ("Shake It Off")

The wildcard acts were announced at the beginning of the show with Jack Walton chosen by Cowell for the Boys, Lola Saunders was chosen by Walsh for the Girls, Stevi Ritchie was chosen by Fernandez-Versini for the Over 26s, and Overload Generation were chosen by Mel B for the Groups.

 Owing to the addition of four wildcard acts, two acts were eliminated from the series' first results show. The three acts with the fewest public votes were announced as the bottom three and then the act with the fewest votes was automatically eliminated. The remaining two acts then performed in the sing-off for the judges' votes.

Judges' vote to eliminate
 Cowell: Overload Generation – stated that he thought Nala's sing-off performance was better than Overload Generation's "shockingly bad" performance and said that he "absolutely cannot support an act [he has] no belief in at all", and Nala is someone he could work with; he reiterated his statement on The Xtra Factor, saying he was not surprised about Overload Generation ending up in the bottom three and that Nala's saving was a "lucky escape" on his doing.
 Fernandez-Versini: Overload Generation – backed her own act, Stephanie Nala, whom she said sang better in the sing off.
 Mel B: Stephanie Nala – stated that she had to stay true to whom she picked as Walsh's wildcard act.
 Walsh: Stephanie Nala – backed his own act, Overload Generation.

With the acts in the sing-off receiving two votes each, the result went to deadlock and reverted to the earlier public vote. Overload Generation were eliminated as the act with the fewest public votes.

Week 2 (18/19 October)
Theme: 1980s music
Group performance: "Love Runs Out"
Musical guests: Jessie J ("Bang Bang") and Maroon 5 ("Animals")

 Owing to the addition of four wildcard acts, two acts were eliminated from the series' second results show. The three acts with the fewest public votes were announced as the bottom three and then the act with the fewest votes was automatically eliminated. The remaining two acts then performed in the sing-off for the judges' votes.

Judges' vote to eliminate
 Fernandez-Versini: Stereo Kicks – gave no reason but effectively backed her own act, Chloe Jasmine.
 Walsh: Chloe Jasmine – gave no reason but effectively backed his own act, Stereo Kicks.
 Mel B: Chloe Jasmine – based on the sing-off performances.
 Cowell: Chloe Jasmine – stated that he thought Walsh did not know "what to do with" Stereo Kicks, but that they had more potential; he stated on The Xtra Factor that he felt they wanted their place in the competition more.

Week 3 (25/26 October)
Theme: "Movies" (songs from films)
Group performance: "Rather Be"
Musical guests: OneRepublic ("I Lived") and Ed Sheeran ("Thinking Out Loud")

Judges' vote to eliminate
Mel B: Only The Young – gave no reason but effectively backed her own act, Jake Quickenden.
Walsh: Jake Quickenden – backed his own act, Only The Young.
Cowell: Jake Quickenden – criticised both acts' sing-off performances but felt that Only The Young had more potential.
Fernandez-Versini: Jake Quickenden – felt that Only The Young had not identified their "comfort zone yet" and had "the most potential to go forward in the competition".

Week 4 (1/2 November)
Theme: Halloween
Group performance: "Firework"
Musical guests:
Saturday: The Script ("No Good in Goodbye")
Sunday: John Legend ("Ordinary People"/"All of Me") and Cheryl ("I Don't Care")

Notes
On 31 October, it was revealed that, after warnings by Cowell to the contestants, the act with the fewest votes on Saturday's live show would be eliminated immediately. Walton was eliminated after receiving the fewest votes. The two acts with the next fewest votes on Sunday's results show then performed in the sing-off for the judges' votes.

Judges' vote to eliminate
 Walsh: Lola Saunders – backed his own act, Stereo Kicks, although he later stated on The Xtra Factor that he did not want to send Saunders home as he chose her as Fernandez-Versini's wildcard.
 Fernandez-Versini: Stereo Kicks – backed her own act, Lola Saunders.
 Mel B: Lola Saunders – based on the sing-off performances, but complained about Stereo Kicks' lack of consistency.
 Cowell: Stereo Kicks – said that Saunders was the "clear better singer" and had more potential.

With the acts in the sing-off receiving two votes each, the result went to deadlock and reverted to the earlier public vote. Saunders was eliminated as the act with the fewest public votes.

Week 5 (8/9 November)
Theme: Songs by Queen or Michael Jackson (billed as Queen vs. Michael Jackson; original theme was Disco)
Group performance: "Never Forget"
Musical guests: Sam Smith ("Like I Can") and One Direction ("Steal My Girl")

Judges vote to eliminate
Cowell: Paul Akister – backed his own act, Jay James, stating that he needed the opportunity the show has given him.
Mel B: Jay James – gave no reason but effectively backed her own act, Paul Akister.
Fernandez-Versini: Jay James – based on the sing-off performances.
Walsh: Paul Akister – could not decide so chose to take the vote to deadlock; he was hesitant to say who he wanted to eliminate, as he had previously eliminated Akister at judges' houses in series 10.

With the acts in the sing-off receiving two votes each, the result went to deadlock and reverted to the earlier public vote. Akister was eliminated as the act with the fewest public votes.

Week 6 (15/16 November)
Theme: Big band
Group performance: "Shake It Off"
Musical guests: Nicole Scherzinger ("Run") and Olly Murs ("Wrapped Up")
The world premiere play and official video of the Band Aid 30 track "Do They Know It's Christmas?" were aired during the results show. Bob Geldof appeared on the results show to talk about the recording and promote the single.

Judges vote to eliminate
Cowell: Stevi Ritchie – conflicted about both his acts in the bottom two; said although Ritchie was the better performer, James was the better singer.
Walsh: Stevi Ritchie – said James was the better singer.
Mel B: Jay James – said James did amazing in the sing off but Ritchie surprised her by singing.
Fernandez-Versini: Jay James – stated she would miss Ritchie's presence if she sent Ritchie home as she reinstated him as Cowell's wildcard.
With the acts in the sing-off receiving two votes each, the result went to deadlock and reverted to the earlier public vote. James was eliminated as the act with the fewest public votes.

Week 7 (22/23 November)
Theme: Songs by Whitney Houston or Elton John (billed as Whitney Houston vs. Elton John)
Group performance: "Saturday Night's Alright for Fighting"
Musical guests:
Saturday: David Guetta featuring Emeli Sandé ("What I Did for Love")
Sunday: Labrinth ("Jealous") and Take That ("These Days")

Notes
This week featured a double elimination. The first of the eliminations happened on Saturday night after the special guest performance from David Guetta and Emeli Sande. Only The Young were eliminated after receiving the fewest votes. The two acts with the next fewest votes on Sunday's results show then performed in the sing-off for the judges' votes.

Judges' votes to eliminate
Mel B: Stevi Ritchie – based on the sing-off performances, effectively backing her own act, Andrea Faustini.
Fernandez-Versini: Stevi Ritchie – based on the sing-off performances and the fact that she saved Ritchie the previous week.
Cowell: Andrea Faustini – backed his own act, Stevi Ritchie.
Walsh: Stevi Ritchie – stated that he admired Faustini from the beginning.

However, voting statistics revealed that Ritchie received more votes than Faustini which meant that if Walsh sent the result to deadlock, Ritchie would have advanced to the quarter-final and Faustini would have been eliminated.

Week 8: Quarter-Final (29/30 November)
 Themes: Songs chosen by other artists; Jukebox
 Group performance: "Somebody to Love" (with Queen + Adam Lambert)
 Musical guests: Queen + Adam Lambert ("Somebody to Love", with finalists), Union J ("You Got It All") and Ella Henderson ("Yours")

For the first time this series, the acts performed two songs each. One song was chosen by a public vote via the official The X Factor app. The second song was chosen by various music artists.

Judges' vote to eliminate
Walsh: Lauren Platt – backed his own act, Stereo Kicks.
Mel B: Lauren Platt – based on the sing-off performances, although she expressed her reluctance to vote before Fernandez-Versini.
Fernandez-Versini: Stereo Kicks – backed her own act, Lauren Platt.
Cowell: Stereo Kicks – based on the sing-off performances stating that Platt sang the best in the sing-off.

With the acts in the sing-off receiving two votes each, the result went to deadlock and reverted to the earlier public vote. Stereo Kicks were eliminated as the act with the fewest public votes.

Week 9: Semi-Final (6/7 December)
Themes: Christmas; song to get you to the final (no theme)
Musical guests: Fifth Harmony ("BO$$"), Sam Bailey ("With You") and Idina Menzel & Michael Bublé ("Baby, It's Cold Outside")

Judges vote to eliminate
Fernandez-Versini: Andrea Faustini – gave no reason but effectively backed her own act, Lauren Platt.
Mel B: Lauren Platt – backed her own act, Andrea Faustini, but called Platt's vocals one of her best.
Walsh: Lauren Platt – gave no reason.
Cowell: Lauren Platt – noted that this was both contestants' second time in the bottom two, and despite supporting his decision to send Platt through to the semi-final and criticising Faustini's oversinging, decided that Faustini had earned his overall place in the final throughout the series more.

However, voting statistics revealed that Platt received more votes than Faustini which meant that if Cowell sent the result to deadlock, Platt would have advanced to the final and Faustini would have been eliminated.

Week 10: Final (13/14 December)
Mel B did not appear on the judging panel on Saturday's show due to illness and was replaced by former judge Tulisa.;13 December
Themes: No theme; celebrity duets
Group performance: "Rule the World" (with Take That); "All About That Bass" (with Meghan Trainor)
Musical guests: Take That ("Rule the World", with contestants); Meghan Trainor ("All About That Bass", with contestants); Stevi Ritchie, Chloe Jasmine, Wagner, Diva Fever, Chico Slimani & Katie Waissel ("(I've Had) The Time of My Life" / "The Time (Dirty Bit)"); and Ed Sheeran ("Photograph")

Andrea Faustini received the fewest public votes and was automatically eliminated.

14 December
Themes: Favourite performance (billed as "song of the series"); winner's single
Group performance: "Flashdance... What a Feeling" (all contestants)
Musical guests: Olly Murs featuring Demi Lovato ("Up"), One Direction featuring Ronnie Wood ("Where Do Broken Hearts Go") and Sam Smith ("Stay with Me")

Ratings

 Includes advert breaks
 Excludes ITV+1
 The rank for the ITV broadcast, compared with all channels for that week, from Monday to Sunday.

Controversies

Adam Miller

In July 2014, it was reported that auditionee Adam Miller was suing producers of the show for "cruel" treatment, claiming that they urged him to audition and persuaded him that he "wouldn't be embarrassing" himself, but he was then laughed at by Cowell during his audition which caused much controversy. Miller reportedly required counselling, and said, "I've been lied to, manipulated and used by the show and I can't be the only one. It might be Simon Cowell and it might be The X Factor, but that's wrong and I'm not going to let them get away with it. They approached me. They gave me a bit of self-confidence, then cruelly and deliberately stripped it away to make good TV." A spokesperson confirmed that Miller's audition would not be broadcast.

Chloe Jasmine

There were allegations of favouritism after Chloe Jasmine was allowed to audition twice. She apparently fluffed her arena audition by forgetting her words and bursting into tears, but none of this was shown on television. Instead, viewers saw Jasmine sail through to bootcamp after wowing the judges on a different night and singing the song "Why Don't You Do Right", tricking them into thinking that that had been her only audition. However, a show insider claimed that Chloe was given a second chance because she was going through a rough time: "Chloe was given a second chance as she was upset during her first performance. She had recently split up with her boyfriend so she wasn't in a fit state to perform. We gave her the chance to go away and compose herself. This does happen and the only reason it wasn't seen on the show was that there wasn't enough time to fit all of this into one episode."

Stereo Kicks

During The Xtra Factor after the second results show, in which Stereo Kicks took part in the sing-off, Crawford asked Walsh, their mentor, about them. He said, live on television, that he "never wanted eight boys in the band", "Simon put them together" and generally insinuated that he wanted to cut several members from the band. During several interviews between the week 2 results and the week 3 performance, Stereo Kicks mentioned how disappointed they were that their mentor didn't seem to want them, and there were rumours that the band would be split up during the week 3 live performances. These rumours turned out to be false, and Cowell made Walsh apologise to the band after their week 3 performance. Cowell also offered Stereo Kicks the opportunity to be mentored by him, although it is not certain whether he was serious.

Stereo Kicks announced they had split up on 18 July 2015. Stereo Kicks member Reece Bibby joined a new band, New Hope Club, that November.

Fleur East

After Fleur East completed her performance in week 2, Mel B commented that East had allowed the backing vocals of the track to drown out her own, and accused her of "cheating." This caused a massive uproar backstage after the live show had ended, especially between Mel B and Cowell, East's mentor.

Also, as the semi-finals approached, the other semi-finalists, Andrea Faustini, Ben Haenow and Lauren Platt, were reported to have complained about the judges apparently setting East up to win, with a source saying "It's beginning to look obvious the judges want her to win. It may as well be called The F Factor – it's very unfair." Haenow later stated in an interview that the rumours were false, and that their mentor Cowell is not biased towards any of his acts.

Halloween dancers

During the fourth live show, Fernandez-Versini said that her act, Lola Saunders, kept to the theme of Halloween by having dancers dressed in straitjackets behind her, while performing the Gnarls Barkley song "Crazy". This caused problems to charities that help mental health suffers that felt that the performance and comments helped to normalise the stereotype that mental health sufferers are dangerous. No public apology was issued.

Idina Menzel and Michael Buble performance

During the results show of the semi-final, Idina Menzel and Michael Buble were invited to perform Baby, It's Cold Outside from Menzel's latest album. After the performance had finished Cowell and Walsh gave the duo a standing ovation while Mel B and Fernandez-Versini remained seated without applauding. Many viewers or the show and fans of the artists critiqued the judges as being "disrespectful" of the guests and ignoring common decency. The day after, Fernandez-Versini issued a statement saying that her and Mel B were too focused on their acts being in the bottom two to applaud and her dress made it difficult to stand.

Louis Walsh inadvertently groping Mel B on live television

During The Xtra Factor after the semi-final results show, Mel B scolded Walsh for accidentally grabbing her bum during an interview. Visibly irritated she moved away from Walsh, who said he was only looking after her. Crawford and the other judges, Cowell and Fernandez-Versini, tried to reassure her that she was "safe" while laughing off the gesture. After resurfacing on social media in July 2018, the clip sparked outrage around the normalcy of sexual harassment. The video caused a debate among users with some defending Walsh based on his alleged homosexuality and the justification that he was unaware of what he was doing. Others pointed out if it can happen so openly in a public setting there is a correlation to how frequently it may happen behind closed doors. Walsh stated on 21 July that he grabbed Mel B's bottom as a joke, but conceded that the gesture was no longer politically correct due to social media reaction.

References

External links
 

 11
2014 in British television
United Kingdom 11